Saaheb is a 1985 Indian Hindi-language drama film directed by Anil Ganguly. It is a remake of the 1981 Bengali film Saheb directed by Bijoy Bose. The film stars Anil Kapoor, Amrita Singh, Raakhee, Deven Verma, Utpal Dutt, Biswajit, Vijay Arora, A. K. Hangal and Dilip Dhawan. The music was composed by Bappi Lahiri. The plot follows Saaheb, the youngest son of a family, who is focused on football. Due to this, everyone in the family constantly tells him he is no good. However, when circumstances demand, he gives up his kidney to fund his sister's marriage, at the cost of his football career.

The movie has catchy songs like - "Yaar Bina Chain Kahan Re" and "Kya Khabar Kya Pata" - which remain popular to this day. The film was remade in Telugu as Vijetha (1985), in Kannada as Karna (1986), and in Malayalam as Chekkaeran Oru Chilla (1986).

Plot

Retired Badri Prasad Sharma lives with his sons and their family. His younger son Sunil aka Saheb and daughter Gulti are the only one not married. Saheb is a Goal Keeper and football is his passion. But he is demotivated all the time by his brothers and their wives. Only person who understands him is his elder sister in law Sujata  with whom he shares a motherly bond. Saheb meets Natasha aka Nikki and both fall in love. Badri Prasad faces financial trouble as he needs 50,000 for marriage of Gulti and none of his sons put a helping thou they are earning well. He finally decides to sell his house to arrange the expenses. Saheb cant see his father breaking down and selling ancestral house. He comes across the news that a rich businessman Sinha requires a kidney donor for his son and willing to pay any amount to the donor. Saheb decides to donate his kidney knowing that he will never be able to play football again.

Cast

Anil Kapoor as Sunil Sharma 'Saaheb'
Amrita Singh as Natasha 'Nikki'
Raakhee as Sujata Sharma, Saaheb's eldest sister-in-law
Utpal Dutt as Badri Prasad Sharma, Saaheb's Father
Biswajeet as Eldest Son
Vijay Arora as Kamal Sharma, Second Son
Rajnibala as Kamal's Wife
Dilip Dhawan as Third Son
Deven Verma as Pareshan, Nikki's Uncle
Satyen Kappu as Nikki's father
A.K. Hangal as Doctor
Pinchoo Kapoor as Mr. S.P. Sinha
Suresh Chatwal as Mr. Somnath, Saaheb's Football Coach
Nandita Thakur as Shanti
Jankidas as Jandubalm
Viju Khote
Dinesh Hingoo

Soundtrack 
Anjaan wrote all the lyrics. 

The song "Yaar Bina Chain Kahan Re" has been recreated twice, first time for 2014 film Main Aur Mr. Riight and second time for the 2020 film Shubh Mangal Zyada Saavdhan.

References

External links 
 

1985 films
1980s Hindi-language films
Films scored by Bappi Lahiri
Hindi remakes of Bengali films